The Battle of Tochar Cruacháin Brí Eile or Cruachán Brí Eile took place in 1385 near what is now the village of Croghan in County Offaly, Ireland. The battle pitted the Gaelic forces of Uí Failghe, led by Murchadh Ó Conchobhair, against the Normans. The army of Uí Failghe was victorious. "Nugent of Meath, Chambers and his son, and a countless host of the chiefs and plebeians of the English were slain", according to the Annals of the Four Masters.

References

Tochar Cruachain-Bri-Ele
Tochar Cruachain
Tochar Cruachain
1385 in Ireland
History of County Offaly